Kite Hill is a city park and natural area in the Castro district of San Francisco, California. At an elevation of 350 feet, the 2.87 acre park is named for its gusty winds. The natural area includes a panoramic view of San Francisco.

Kite Hill was purchased by the city and incorporated into the San Francisco Natural Areas Program in 1977.

References 

Castro District, San Francisco
Parks in San Francisco